Apatochernes is a genus of pseudoscorpions in the subfamily Chernetinae.

Species 
Apatochernes antarcticus - Apatochernes chathamensis - Apatochernes cheliferoides - Apatochernes cruciatus - Apatochernes curtulus - Apatochernes gallinaceus - Apatochernes insolitus - Apatochernes kuscheli - Apatochernes maoricus - Apatochernes nestoris - Apatochernes obrieni - Apatochernes posticus - Apatochernes proximus - Apatochernes solitarius - Apatochernes turbotti - Apatochernes vastus - Apatochernes wisei

References

External links 
 
 

Chernetidae
Pseudoscorpion genera